Faith of Our Fathers is a 2015 American Christian drama film directed by Carey Scott and written by Kevin Downes, Carey Scott, Harold Uhl and David A. R. White. The film stars Downes, White, Stephen Baldwin, Candace Cameron Bure, Rebecca St. James and Sean McGowan.

Initially titled To the Wall when shown to preview audiences in January 2015, this was changed prior to its national release on July 1, 2015 by Pure Flix Entertainment and Samuel Goldwyn Films.

Plot
Meek postal service worker John Paul George (Kevin Downes), is named after three members of The Beatles. He has never met his father, Stephen (Sean McGowan), because Stephen died during the Vietnam War in 1969.

While rummaging through the garage of his recently deceased mother's house, John comes across a box of his father's war belongings and finds a letter mentioning "Eddie J. Adams" (Scott Whyte), his best friend from Vietnam. Curious, John starts calling people in the country with that name. He eventually comes across someone who seems to recognize the name.

John travels to Mississippi, where he finds that the person with whom he conversed on the phone was actually Edward's son, Wayne Adams (David A. R. White). Wayne is an ill-tempered hermit. Wayne reveals that he has many letters from his father, most of which detail John's father, who helped him rediscover his Christian faith.

Later that night, Wayne impulsively cuts the roof off his 1965 Ford Thunderbird to "make it a convertible for a road trip". Confused and angered because his wedding to his fiancée Cynthia (Candace Cameron Bure) is in a matter of weeks, John protests the trip. He prefers to just read the letters at Wayne's house. Wayne is insistent, however, that they go on the long and arduous road trip to visit the Vietnam Veterans Memorial in Washington, D.C., to see their fathers' names on The Wall and get closure.

During the trip the two men repeatedly clash over many things, but they learn more about their fathers and themselves. Wayne gets into a fight with rowdy gas station patrons. He also forces John to pay him for the letters if he wants to read them, on the trip .

Cast
Kevin Downes as John Paul George
David A.R. White as Wayne Adams
Stephen Baldwin as Mansfield
Candace Cameron Bure as Cynthia
Rebecca St. James as Annie
Sean McGowan as Stephen George
Scott Whyte as Edward "Eddie" Adams
Ryan Doom as Pvt. Shears

Reception
Audiences and critics panned Faith of Our Fathers. On Rotten Tomatoes, the film has a 9% approval rating based on 11 reviews, with an average rating of 4/10. On Metacritic, which assigns a normalized rating, the film has a score of 20 out of 100, based on 5 critics, indicating "generally unfavorable reviews".

References

External links
 
 
 

2015 films
American drama road movies
2010s drama road movies
Vietnam War films
Films set in 1969
Films set in 1997
2015 drama films
Films produced by David A. R. White
Pure Flix Entertainment films
Films set in Mississippi
Films with screenplays by David A. R. White
Films with screenplays by Kevin Downes
Films produced by Kevin Downes
Films produced by Bobby Downes
2010s English-language films
2010s American films